Raymond George Girardin Jr. (January 23, 1935 – February 28, 2019) was an American film, stage, and television actor.

Life and career 
Girardin was born in Wakefield, Massachusetts. After graduating from Wakefield High School he joined the Marines, serving for two years. After his discharge he attended Boston University, where he studied theatre and acted in summer stock theaters. After graduating from Boston University Girardin moved to New York, where he performed on stage, before settling in Hollywood, California.  

After guest appearances in The Man from U.N.C.L.E. and Judd, for the Defense, Girardin played Howie Dawson in the soap opera television series General Hospital from 1968 to 1974.

From the 1970s to the 1990s, Girardin appeared in films including Max Dugan Returns, The Lonely Guy, Star!, Scandal in a Small Town, Loverboy, The Executioner's Song, Midnight Offerings, Dad, Silence of the Heart, Badge of the Assassin, Love Affair, Gospa, Number One with a Bullet, and Hollywood Man, which he wrote with William Smith, Tom Farese and Dominic Gombardella. He guest-starred in numerous television programs such as Barney Miller, The Rockford Files, Thunder, St. Elsewhere, The Greatest American Hero, Hart to Hart, Hardcastle and McCormick, Hill Street Blues, Newhart, Remington Steele, The Law & Harry McGraw, Married… with Children, The A-Team, What's Happening Now!!, Benson, Mork & Mindy, Happy Days, From Here to Eternity, Gunsmoke, The White Shadow, T.J. Hooker, Hooperman, The Magical World of Disney, Murder, She Wrote, Baywatch, New York Undercover, Capital News,  and L.A. Law, and was a regular cast member of Flip Wilson's television sitcom Charlie & Co.'', playing the role of Charles Richmond's boss Walter Simpson.

Girardin retired from acting in the late 1990s, afterwards directing at the Academy Theater in Orleans, Massachusetts on Cape Cod.

Death 
Girardin died at the age of 84 in February 2019 of complications of Alzheimer's disease, in Amherst, Massachusetts.

Filmography

Film

Television

References

External links 

Rotten Tomatoes profile

1935 births
2019 deaths
Deaths from Alzheimer's disease
Neurological disease deaths in Massachusetts
Boston University alumni
People from Wakefield, Massachusetts
Male actors from Massachusetts
American male film actors
American male stage actors
American male television actors
American male soap opera actors
20th-century American male actors